Project V13 is a role-playing video game under development by the resurrected Black Isle Studios. The game is the successor to the cancelled Interplay Entertainment Fallout Online project. The game is reliant on the Black Isle Mayan Apocalypse Replacement Program, an InvestedIn powered system similar to the crowd funding website Kickstarter.

Gameplay
The player character is to be one of the last humans or a new breed of mutant. The human class is split into three options, basic human, transhuman and cyborg. Each class has its own advantages and disadvantages. Transhumans used biological technologies to help evolve them and their descendants, whereas cyborgs used "hard" technological implants to change themselves. Nannites, tiny machines, work inside cyborgs to help create a sustaining cyborg race. To create the character, the player must select a race, sex, background and equip them with an item. Once a player character is created, they will be given a colony to create. The colony, which can be created over a deserted city, ruined military base or gas station, comes with a few tools and apocalypse survivors. Leading the colony, the player is able to choose where and when to make buildings and decide how they will be staffed. In order to staff buildings, the player must attract and recruit survivors to work in the colony.

To avoid being more than just a simulation game, the player will also have the option to travel around and experience adventures and go on quests. Said quests are self-contained, giving the player the option to do anything necessary to get the job done. The quests allows for players to gain experience and benefit the town. Missions range from traveling to scavenge lost technology, or fending the town off from a horde of evil villains. Doing missions benefits the colony, while forging the colony helps build missions.

All major decisions related to skill and statistics have been offloaded to character development. This allows for the player choose their "focus" in the game, giving the player the chance to choose as to whether their character will be a natural born leader or a despot.

Development
To work on a new role-playing game project, Interplay restarted Black Isle Studios. Taking in a project previously worked on by Masthead Studios, Black Isle Studios began work on Project V13. It scrapped most of the ideas and development made by Masthead, and decided to take Project V13 in a different direction.

In order to fund enough money to create a tech demo to attract investors for the game, Black Isle launched the Black Isle Mayan Apocalypse Replacement Program, (BIMAR). Similar to Kickstarter, BIMAR has people give money to the company in the style of a fundraiser. Depending on the amount of money given to BIMAR, different rewards are given. Backers have access to a private forum where they are able to discuss the game and suggest ideas to the developers.

Not able to gain the rights to make a Fallout game as they originally intended, they created Project V13 to be a different post-apocalyptic strategy role-playing game, removing all references to Fallout in their game.

See also
 Wasteland 2 (2014) – Project V13 was derived from Fallout, which was itself a spiritual successor to Wasteland (1988)

References

Role-playing video games
Vaporware video games
Windows games